The 2022–23 Segunda División (known as LaLiga SmartBank for sponsorship reasons) football season, is the 92nd since its establishment in Spain.

Teams

Team changes

Promotion and relegation (pre-season)
A total of 22 teams will contest the league, including 15 sides from the 2021–22 season, three relegated from the 2021–22 La Liga, and four promoted from the 2021–22 Primera División RFEF.

Teams promoted to La Liga
The first two teams to earn promotion from Segunda División were Almería and Real Valladolid, who mathematically secured first and second position, respectively, on the very last match day of the season. Almería return to La Liga after a seven-year absence, while Valladolid return after a one-year absence. The third and final team to be promoted were Girona  after winning the play-off final 3–1 against Tenerife, returning after a three-years absence.

Teams relegated from La Liga
The first team to be relegated from La Liga were Levante, following a 0–6 loss to Real Madrid on 12 May 2022, ending their five years in the top tier. The second team to be relegated were Alavés, after defeated 1-3 by Levante on 15 May 2022, ending their six years stay in the top tier. The third and final team relegated to Segunda was Granada, who drew against Espanyol, which was coupled with wins of Cádiz and Mallorca on 22 May 2022, the final match day. Granada ended a three-year stay in the top level.

Teams relegated to Primera División RFEF

On 16 April 2022, Alcorcón became the first team to be relegated from Segunda División after defeated by Cartagena, ending their 12-year stay in the second division. The second team to be relegated were Fuenlabrada, who were relegated on 7 May 2022 after defeated by Real Sociedad B, ending three years spell in the second division. Alcorcon and Fuenlabrada was followed by Real Sociedad B and Amorebieta. Both of those clubs were relegated on 21 May 2022, making an immediate return to the third tier after a single season in Segunda División.

Teams promoted from Primera División RFEF

On 1 May 2022, Racing Santander became the first team to achieve promotion to the second tier after a 2–2 draw against Celta de Vigo B, securing direct promotion and ending a two-season stint at the third tier of Spanish football. The second team to earn promotion was Andorra after beating UCAM Murcia on 21 May 2022, thus getting promoted to the second tier for the first time in their history. On 11 June 2022, Albacete and Villarreal B were both promoted, after defeating Deportivo La Coruña and Gimnàstic, respectively, in the final of the play-offs. Albacete returned after a one year absence and Villarreal B returned after 10 years in the third tier.

Stadiums and locations

Personnel and sponsorship

Managerial changes

League table

Standings

Results

Positions by round

The table lists the positions of teams after each week of matches. In order to preserve chronological evolvements, any postponed matches are not included to the round at which they were originally scheduled, but added to the full round they were played immediately afterwards.

Promotion play-offs

Season statistics

Top goalscorers

Assists

Zamora Trophy

The Zamora Trophy was awarded by newspaper Marca to the goalkeeper with the lowest goals-to-games ratio. A goalkeeper had to have played at least 28 games of 60 or more minutes to be eligible for the trophy.

Hat-tricks

Note
(H) – Home ; (A) – Away

Awards

Monthly

Number of teams by regions

See also
2022–23 La Liga
2022–23 Primera Federación
2022–23 Segunda Federación
2022–23 Tercera Federación

References

Segunda División seasons
2022–23 in European second tier association football leagues
2022–23 in Spanish football
Current association football seasons